Bunny as a Reporter is an American silent comedy film.

Plot summary
Bunny, an amateur reporter, wants to impress the editor of a small-town newspaper, so he disguises himself as a woman and infiltrates a secret suffragette meeting.

Release
Bunny as a Reporter was released on June 3, 1913, in the United States, where it was presented as a split-reel with another Vitagraph comedy, Three to One. It was released in London September 18, 1913.

Cast
John Bunny as Bunny	
Flora Finch as Leader of the Suffragettes
Charles Eldridge as Editor
 Tom Sutton as Farmer

References

External links
 

1913 films
1913 comedy films
Silent American comedy films
American black-and-white films
American silent short films
American comedy short films
Films directed by Wilfrid North
1910s American films
1910s English-language films